IRNSS-1C is the third out of seven in the Indian Regional Navigation Satellite System (IRNSS) series of satellites after IRNSS-1A and IRNSS-1B. The IRNSS constellation of satellites is slated to be launched to provide navigational services to the region. It was launched on 15 October 2014 at 20:02 UTC by PSLV-C26 and will be placed in geostationary orbit.

Satellite 
The satellite will help augmenting the satellite based navigation system of India which is currently under development. The navigational system so developed will be a regional one targeted towards South Asia. The satellite will provide navigation, tracking and mapping services.

IRNSS-1C satellite will have two payloads: a navigation payload and CDMA ranging payload in addition with a laser retro-reflector. The payload generates navigation signals at L5 and S-band. The design of the payload makes the IRNSS system inter-operable and compatible with Global Positioning System (GPS) and Galileo systems. The satellite is powered by two solar arrays, which generate up to 1,660 watts, and has a life-time of ten years.

IRNSS-1C was launched successfully on 16 October 2014 at 1:32 am IST from Satish Dhawan Space Centre in Sriharikota. An update from ISRO's official Facebook page on 18 October 2014 states that

Navigation Satellite IRNSS 1C Update:

The second orbit raising operation of IRNSS-1C is successfully completed by firing the Apogee Motor for 1,563 seconds.
The current orbital parameters are:

See also 

 Communication-Centric Intelligence Satellite (CCI-Sat)
 GPS-aided geo-augmented navigation (GAGAN)
 Satellite navigation

References

External links 
 ISRO Future Programmes

2014 in India
Spacecraft launched in 2014
IRNSS satellites
Spacecraft launched by PSLV rockets